Yanko Georgiev (born 22 October 1988) is a Bulgarian football goalkeeper who currently plays for Pirin Blagoevgrad.

Career

Black Sea coast
Born in Burgas, Georgiev have played for locals Pomorie, Chernomorets Burgas, Naftex Burgas, Chernomorets Pomorie, PFC Burgas and Neftochimic Burgas.

With Neftochimic Burgas he signed on 15 June 2016 after the team was administratively promoted to the newly established Bulgarian First League, taking the place of A Group. He made his debut for the team on 21 August 2016 in a match against Beroe Stara Zagora keeping a clean sheet for the 1:0 win. On 20 September 2016 he played in the Bulgarian Cup match against Etar Veliko Tarnovo, won by Neftohimic after penalties. The team was on the relegate zone and on 2 June 2017 they played in a play-off against Vitosha Bistritsa were Neftochimic lost and relegate to Bulgarian Second League. After that most of the players, including Georgiev left the club due to the financial problems in the team.

Septemvri Sofia
On 18 June 2017 he signed with the newly promoted to Bulgarian First League team of Septemvri Sofia together with his teammates from Neftohimic last season - Ivan Valchanov and Vladislav Romanov. He made his debut for the team on 11 August 2017 coming on as a substitute after Valentin Galev received an injury in the 20th minute of the match against CSKA Sofia.

Career statistics

Club

References

External links
 
 
 Player Profile at Football24
 Player Profile at Sportal.bg

1988 births
Living people
Sportspeople from Burgas
Bulgarian footballers
PFC Chernomorets Burgas players
FC Pomorie players
Neftochimic Burgas players
FC Septemvri Sofia players
Botev Plovdiv players
FC Tsarsko Selo Sofia players
First Professional Football League (Bulgaria) players
Association football goalkeepers